The Atayalic languages are a group of Formosan languages spoken in northern Taiwan. Robert Blust considers them to form a primary branch within the Austronesian language family, However, Paul Jen-kuei Li groups them into the Northern Formosan branch, which includes the Northwestern Formosan languages.

Classification

Li (1981) and Li (1982) classify the Atayalic languages and dialects as follows:

Atayalic
Atayal
Squliq Atayal
Squliq
Maspaziʔ
Pyanan
Lmuan
Habun Bazinuq
Syanuh
Kulu
ŋŋupa
Haga-Paris
Kubaboo
Rghayuŋ
C'uli' Atayal (also known as Ts'ole' Atayal)
Skikun, Mnibuʔ
Mnawyan
Mayrinax (includes female and male registers)
Mabatuʔan
Matabalay
Sakuxan
Palŋawan
Mkgugut
Pyahaw
Ryuhiŋ
Mtlaŋan
Knŋyan
Seediq
Toŋan
Toda
Truwan
Inago

Reconstruction

The Proto-Atayalic language was reconstructed by Taiwanese linguist Paul Jen-kuei Li in 1981. Proto-Atayalic had final voiced stops, which are preserved in the Mayrinax dialect of Cʔuliʔ Atayal. These voiced stops include *-b, *-d, *-g, and *-g'. However, they are now lost in many dialects of Atayal, Seediq, and also Pazeh (Blust 2009:615).

References

Notes

General references

 
Languages of Taiwan